Roman Vegerya (born 14 July 2000) is a Belarusian professional footballer who plays for Torpedo-BelAZ Zhodino.

International career
Vegerya earned his first cap for the national team of his country on 26 February 2020, coming on as a last-minute substitute in the 1:0 away win over Bulgaria in a friendly match.

References

External links 
 
 

2000 births
Living people
Belarusian footballers
Association football defenders
Belarus international footballers
FC Neman Grodno players
FC Lida players
FC Isloch Minsk Raion players
FC Rukh Brest players
FC Arsenal Dzerzhinsk players
FC Torpedo-BelAZ Zhodino players